The 1965 Soviet Class A Second Group was the third season of the Soviet Class A Second Group football competitions that was established in 1963. It was also the 25th season of the Soviet second-tier league competition.

First stage

First Subgroup

Second Subgroup

Final stage

For places 1-16

Match for 1st place
 [Nov 25, Grozny]
 Ararat Yerevan  2-1  Kayrat Alma-Ata

For places 17-32

Top scorers
25 goals
 Vladimir Korotkov (Shinnik Yaroslavl)

23 goals
 Valeriy Pogorelov (Traktor Volgograd)

21 goals
 German Apukhtin (SKA Novosibirsk)

18 goals
 Seiran Galstyan (Ararat Yerevan)

17 goals
 Givi Mumladze (Lokomotivi Tbilisi)
 Valentin Kosov (Terek Grozny)

Number of teams by republics

See also
 Soviet First League

External links
 1965 season. RSSSF

1965
2
Soviet
Soviet